Pine Flat may refer to:

Pine Flat, California, in Tulare County
Pine Flat Dam
Pine Flat Lake